The 2020 Cook Out Southern 500, the 71st running of the event,  was a NASCAR Cup Series race held on September 6, 2020 at Darlington Raceway in Darlington, South Carolina. Contested over 367 laps on the  egg-shaped oval, it was the 27th race of the 2020 NASCAR Cup Series season, first race of the Playoffs, and the first race of the Round of 16. It was the first time Darlington hosted three Cup Series races in a single season.

Report

Background

Darlington Raceway is a race track built for NASCAR racing located near Darlington, South Carolina. It is nicknamed "The Lady in Black" and "The Track Too Tough to Tame" by many NASCAR fans and drivers and advertised as "A NASCAR Tradition." It is of a unique, somewhat egg-shaped design, an oval with the ends of very different configurations, a condition which supposedly arose from the proximity of one end of the track to a minnow pond the owner refused to relocate. This situation makes it very challenging for the crews to set up their cars' handling in a way that is effective at both ends.

Entry list
 (R) denotes rookie driver.
 (i) denotes driver who are ineligible for series driver points.

Qualifying
Chase Elliott was awarded the pole for the race as determined by competition-based formula.

Starting Lineup

Race

Stage Results

Stage One
Laps: 115

Stage Two
Laps: 115

Final Stage Results

Stage Three
Laps: 137

Race statistics
 Lead changes: 18 among 6 different drivers
 Cautions/Laps: 7 for 34
 Red flags: 0
 Time of race: 3 hours, 47 minutes and 26 seconds
 Average speed:

Media

Television
NBC Sports covered the race on the television side. Rick Allen, two–time Darlington winner Jeff Burton, Steve Letarte and Dale Earnhardt Jr. covered the race from the booth at Charlotte Motor Speedway. Earnhardt Jr., Dale Jarrett and Kyle Petty also called a portion of the race as part of the Throwback Weekend, Dave Burns, Parker Kligerman and Marty Snider handled the pit road duties on site, and Rutledge Wood handled the features from his home during the race.

Radio
MRN had the radio call for the race, which was also simulcast on Sirius XM NASCAR Radio.

Standings after the race

Drivers' Championship standings

Manufacturers' Championship standings

Note: Only the first 16 positions are included for the driver standings.

References

2020 NASCAR Cup Series
Historically themed events
NASCAR races at Darlington Raceway
September 2020 sports events in the United States
2020 in sports in South Carolina